Sylvia Bloom (circa 1919 - 2016) was an American legal secretary. She donated 6 million dollars to the Henry Street Settlement.

She grew up in Brooklyn. She graduated from Hunter College. From 1947 to 2014, she worked for Cleary Gottlieb Steen & Hamilton. She lived in a  rent-controlled apartment.

Philanthropy 
She amassed an estate of 8.2 million dollars. She donated money to   Henry Street Settlement, Hunter College, and scholarships.

See also 

 Robert Morin (librarian)
 Grace Groner

References 

2016 deaths
Legal secretaries
Year of birth uncertain